Élisabeth Roudinesco (born 10 September 1944) is a French scholar, historian and psychoanalyst, affiliated researcher in history at E.N.S.- P.S.L ; University of Paris, in the group « Identités-Cultures-Territoires ». 

She also conducts a seminar on the history of psychoanalysis at the École Normale Supérieure - Rue d'Ulm. 

Biographer of Jacques Lacan and Sigmund Freud, she mainly worked on the situation of "medicines of the soul" with a focus on psychiatry, psychology and psychoanalysis in France but also worldwide ; she also published "On the history of French Revolution" , "Perverts and Perversion","Family and Homosexuality", "Philosophy and Judaism" and "Identity Politics". Roudinesco also published with Michel Plon a huge Dictionary of Psychoanalysis (7th édition in 2023) translated in many languages but unpublished in English. 
She has been awarded for The Best Book Prize from The Société française d'histoire de la médecine for her book Généalogies (unpublished in English), The "Prix Décembre" 2014 and The "Prix des Prix" 2014 for her biography of Freud, Freud, In his Time and Ours published by Harvard University Press. Her work has been translated into thirty languages.

Life
Roudinesco was born to half-Jewish parents in newly liberated Paris in September 1944, and grew up there. Her mother was Jenny Aubry, née Weiss, a daughter of the Judeo-Protestant bourgeoise, a renowned psychoanalyst and hospital neuro-paediatrician who spent her whole life looking after suffering children: abandoned, ill and in difficulty. She was an anglophile who, in the 1950s, introduced to France John Bowlby's theories on the importance of maternal care, and she worked in collaboration with the Tavistock Clinic in London. She was a friend of Jacques Lacan - and whose sister was the feminist Louise Weiss, of the Javal family. Her father was physician Alexandre Roudinesco, of Romanian origin, who had "a passion for history and a phenomenal library". He was born in Bucharest in a Jewish and francophile milieu, and his father had been an editor.

She received her secondary education in Paris at the Collège Sévigné. She studied Literature at the Sorbonne, with a minor in Linguistics; her master's degree was supervised by Tzvetan Todorov, and her doctoral thesis, entitled Inscription du désir et roman du sujet [Inscription of the desire and novel of the subject], by Jean Levaillant at the Université Paris VIII-Vincennes in 1975.

She also took classes with Michel de Certeau, Gilles Deleuze and Michel Foucault at the time of her master's degree . She next defended her "habilitation à diriger des recherches" (H.D.R – the French accreditation needed to supervise doctoral dissertations) in 1991 with Michelle Perrot as supervisor and Alain Corbin, Dominique Lecourt, Jean-Claude Passeron, Robert Castel, and Serge Leclaire as members of the examining committee. This work was published under the title Généalogies.

From 1969 to 1981, she was a member of the École Freudienne de Paris, founded by psychoanalyst and philosopher Jacques Lacan. She was also a member of the editorial board of Action Poétique (1969–1979). She has written for French national newspapers, Libération (1986–1996), and then Le Monde since 1996.

For the past 30 years, she has been married to Olivier Bétourné, CEO of Éditions du Seuil.

Methodology

Literary
In the 1970s, Elisabeth Roudinesco's first works dealt with literary criticism, notably with Raymond Roussel, Antonin Artaud, Bertolt Brecht and Louis-Ferdinand Céline. At that time, her work concerned linking a singular trajectory and an author's work, without resorting to psycho-biography, in other words, the psychologization of literary work by the clinical study of its author. This approach allowed her to demonstrate that most of 20th century literature has been influenced by the history of Freudianism and psychological medicine based on the theory of degeneration.

History of psychoanalysis in France
From 1979, Elisabeth Roudinesco writes a history of psychoanalysis in France. At that time, the main model was still the biography, because the archives and documents of the psychoanalytical movement were still in the hand of Freud's heirs.

Indeed, this model corresponded to the historiographical trend centered on the notion of the founding father figure; a trend which is at the core of any quest of origins. However, this model has gradually declined.

Considering how psychoanalysis was established as a movement and system of thought, Elisabeth Roudinesco asserted that France was the only country where all the necessary conditions were gathered together, over a long period of time, to successfully establish Freudianism in scientific and cultural life. According to Elisabeth Roudinesco, this favorable situation dated back first to the French Revolution of 1789 which provided a scientific and legal legitimacy to reason, heed/gaze over madness, giving birth to the institution of the asylum. Then, the Dreyfus affair, which has precipitated the arrival of intellectuals' self-awareness as a class. Designating themselves as an 'avant-garde', they furnished fruitful and innovative ideas. Finally, the emergence of literary modernity with Baudelaire, Rimbaud and Lautréamont, who enunciate, in a new style of writing, the project of changing man through "I is another".

Ellenberger
Scholarly historiography emerged with such work as Henri Ellenberger's The Discovery of the Unconscious: The History and Evolution of Dynamic Psychiatry, first published in 1970. Though this book had been known in English-speaking countries since that date, the book (published in French in 1974) remained largely unnoticed in France. Elisabeth Roudinesco republished it with a lengthy new preface in 1994.

In his work, Ellenberger developed a conceptuality of freudianism founded on archivistics and reference to the concepts of "mental tools", "long length" and "system of thought". This last category proposed presenting doctrines in their own terms and structures. The study of the system of thought of dynamic psychiatry, psychotherapies and psychological medicine no longer echoes back to a single founder, but to a plurality of singular itineraries, shattering the biographic model.

From Ellenberger's thesis, Elisabeth Roudinesco retained several guiding principles, while adding methodology derived from the works of the French epistemological school: Georges Canguilhem and Michel Foucault. Thus, the study of system of thought becomes the form in which, at a given time, knowledge achieves independence, finding balance and entering into communication: a history of a man who thinks, systems which intertwine, but also a critical analysis of the concepts of consciousness and subject of knowledge.

Lacan
In 1993, Elisabeth Roudinesco published a biography of French psychoanalyst Jacques Lacan. From 1938, Lacan felt preoccupied by the generalized decline of the patriarchy and tried, like Freud and the English school, to promote the father figure within Western society, under the form of a symbolic function. Roudinesco highlighted the fact that the genius of Lacan's work is the introduction of elements from German philosophy (e.g., Nietzsche, Hegel, Heidegger) within the Freudian doctrine – creating a phenomenon Freud would have never conceived himself, since he built his theory on a biological model (darwinism), by consciously refusing to consider and include any philosophical discourses, contemporary or ancient, in his thought process.

Critic
Physician and philosopher Raymond Tallis wrote a scathing review of the first English language translation of Roudinesco's biography, stating "The innocence with which Roudinesco reports all kinds of clinical cock-ups [in Lacan's medical career] makes this book a particularly disturbing read for a medic." On the opposite, John Forrester, former head of the Department of History and Philosophy of Science at Cambridge University praised her work by saying that it is the most subtle and valuable work done on a national situation along with the work of Nathan Hale done on the American situation of psychoanalysis.

Théroigne de Mericourt
From the study of the melancholic Théroigne de Mericourt (1989), early feminist and famous case of the annals of French alienism – she has been 'gazed' by Jean-Étienne Esquirol in La Salpêtrière – Roudinesco think the French Revolution is a paradigm in the French situation of Freudianism. For Roudinesco, it was necessary to include the analysis of patients into the analysis of doctrines as a major constituting element of the discourses of psychopathology.

Freudianism and politic
Roudinesco think that invariant conditions are required to introduce Freudian ideas and establish psychoanalytical movement in a given space. First, a psychiatric knowledge must have been previously constituted, namely a gaze over madness able to conceptualize the notion of mental illness to the detriment of explanation such as divine possession. Secondly, the existence of a State of right capable of guaranteeing the free practice of a transmission like the transferential kind.

Whenever one or both of theses elements are lacking it explains why the establishment of Freudianism has not been possible (era of the world influenced by Islam or whom the organization is still tribal) or its disappearance ( under totalitarian regime, nazism and communism). She notices that military dictatorship didn't refrain the expansion of psychoanalysis in South American (notably Brazil and Argentina). Roudinesco assesses that caudillo regimes didn't try to eradicate psychoanalysis as a "jewish science" as did Nazism in the years 1933–1944 nor as a "bourgeois science" as did communism over the period 1945–1989.

Political standing

Since 1997, she has expressed political standing in various public debates. She stands in debates such as laicity, cloning, genetics, innate and acquired. She fiercely criticized INSERM's reports of experts over psychotherapies. She is one of the first signers of Pas de Zéro de Conduite's petition against systematic detection of delinquency of children under three years of age, as advocated by another INSERM's report.

Bibliography

Her  book, a biography of Sigmund Freud, has been awarded the Prix Decembre 2014 and then, the Prix des Prix 2014. Professor Emeritus of Psychology (Université catholique de Louvain) Jacques Van Rillaer has produced a critical review of this book. On the opposite, John Forester, former head of Department History and Philosophy of Science at Cambridge University praised her work by saying that it is the most subtle and valuable work done on a national situation along with the work of Nathan Hale on the American situation of psychoanalysis.

Available in English
Jacques Lacan & Co.: A History of Psychoanalysis in France, 1925–1985, 1990, Chicago, Chicago University Press
Madness and Revolution: The Lives and Legends of Theroigne De Mericourt, 1993, Verso.
Jacques Lacan, 1997, New York, Columbia University Press.
Why Psychoanalysis?, 2001, New York, Columbia University Press (European Perspectives: A Series in Social Thought and Cultural Criticism)
 "The Mirror Stage: An Obliterated Archive" in The Cambridge Companion to Lacan, Jean-Michel Rabaté dir., 2003, Cambridge, Cambridge University Press.
For What Tomorrow... : A Dialogue with Jacques Derrida, 2004, Palo Alto, Stanford University Press.
"Psychoanalysis" in The Columbia History of Twentieth-Century French Thought, Lawrence D. Kriztman dir., 2006, New York, Columbia University Press.
Philosophy in Turbulent Times: Canguilhem, Sartre, Foucault, Althusser, Deleuze, Derrida, 2008, New York, Columbia University Press.
« Lacan, The Plague », Psychoanalysis and History, ed. John Forrester, Teddington, Artesian Books, 2008.
"Humanity and Its Gods: Atheism", in Psychoanalysis, Fascism, and Fundamentalism, ed. Julia Borossa and Ivan Ward, Vol. 11, no. 2, 2009, Edinburgh, Edinburgh University Press.
Our Dark Side: A History of Perversion, Cambridge, Polity Press, 2009.
 Revisiting the Jewish Question, Cambridge, Polity Press, 2013.
 Lacan: In Spite of Everything, London, Verso Books, 2014.
 Lacan, Past and Present: A Dialogue (with philosopher Alain Badiou), New York, Columbia University Press, 2014.
 Freud: In His Time and Ours, Cambridge, Harvard University Press, 2016.

Available in Spanish
Diccionario de Psicoanalisis, con Michel Plon, 1998, Ediciones Paidos.
Pensar La Locura, Ensayos sobre Michel Foucault, con J.Postel y G. Canguilhem, 1999, Paidos Argentina.
Por Que El Psicoanalisis? 2000, Paidos Argentina.
Lacan – Esbozo de una vida, Historia de un sistema de pensamiento, 2000, Fondo De Cultura Economica USA.
La Familia en Desorden, 2003, Fondo De Cultura Economica USA.
El Paciente, El Terapeuta y El Estado, 2005, Siglo XXI.
Nuestro lado oscuro – oskuro, Anagrama cheto.

Available in French
Initiation à la linguistique générale, 1967, Paris, L'Expansion scientifique française.
Un Discours au réel : théorie de l'inconscient et politique de la psychanalyse, 1973, Tours, Mame.
L'Inconscient et ses lettres, 1975, Tours, Mame.
Pour une politique de la psychanalyse, 1977, Paris, La Découverte.
La Psychanalyse mère et chienne, avec H.Deluy, 1979, Paris, Union Générale d'Editions.
Théroigne de Méricourt. Une femme mélancolique sous la Révolution, 1989, Paris, Le Seuil.
Jacques Lacan. Esquisse d'une vie, histoire d'un système de pensée, 1993, Paris, Fayard.
Histoire de la psychanalyse en France, vol.1, 1994, Paris, Fayard.
Histoire de la psychanalyse en France, vol.2, 1994, Paris, Fayard.
Généalogies, 1994, Paris, Fayard.
Dictionnaire de la psychanalyse, avec Michel Plon, 1997, Paris, Fayard.
Pourquoi la psychanalyse?, 1999, Paris, Fayard.
Au-delà du conscient : histoire illustrée de la psychiatrie et de la psychanalyse, avec J.P. Bourgeron et P.Morel, 2000, Paris, Hazan.
L'Analyse, l'archive, 2001, Paris, Bibliothèque Nationale de France.
La Famille en désordre, 2002, Paris, Fayard.
Le Patient, le thérapeute et l'État, 2004, Paris, Fayard.
Philosophes dans la tourmente, 2005, Paris, Fayard.
La part obscure de nous-mêmes – Une histoire des pervers, Albin Michel, Paris, 2007.
Retour sur la question juive, Albin Michel, Paris, 2009.

Available in Italian
Jacques Lacan : profilo di una vita, storia di un sistema di pensiero, Milano: R. Cortina, 1995.
Perché la Psicanalisi? prefazione di Giancarlo Ricci, Roma: Editori Riuniti, 2000.
Quale domani...? con Jacques Derrida, Torino : Bollati Boringhieri, 2004.
Antropologia della cura, A cura di Elisabeth Roudinesco e Roberto Beneduce, Bollati Boringhieri, 2005
Antropologia e Psicanalisi. Vol. I Etnopsicanalisi. Temi e protagonisti di un dialogo incompiuto. Vol. II Antropologia della cura, Torino, Bollati Boringhieri, 2005. A cura di Elisabeth Roudinesco e Roberto Beneduce.
La famiglia in disordine, Roma : Meltemi, 2006.
La parte oscura di noi stessi.Una storia dei perversi, Colla Editore 2008

Available in German
Die Geschichte der Psychoanalyse in Frankreich. Band I, 1994
Die Geschichte der Psychoanalyse in Frankreich. Band II, 1998
Jacques Lacan. Bericht über ein Leben. Geschichte eines Denksystems, 1996, Kiepenheuer & Witsch.
Wozu Psychoanalyse?, 2002, Klett-Cotta.
Wörterbuch der Psychoanalyse, 2004, Wien, Springer.
Woraus wird Morgen gemacht sein? Ein Dialog, J.Derrida, 2006, Klett-Cotta.

Available in Portuguese
Jacques Lacan, Zahar, 1994.
Théroigne de Méricourt – Uma Mulher Melancólica durante a Revolução, Zahar, 1997.
Dicionario de psicanalise, Michel Plon, Zahar, 1998.
De Que Amanhã..., Jacques Derrida, Zahar, 2004.
Filósofos na tormenta, Canguilhem, Sartre, Foucault, Althusser, Deleuze e Derrida, Zahar, 2008.
A Parte Obscura de Nós Mesmo, Zahar, 2009.
Retorno à Questão Judaica, Zahar, 2010.
Lacan, a Despeito de Tudo e de Todos, Zahar, 2011.

Available in Polish
 Elisabeth Roudinesco, Jacques Lacan. Jego życie i myśl, Wydawnictwo KR, Warszawa 2005.

Critical literature
Nathalie Jaudel
Roudinesco, plagiaire de soi-même (suivi de : Lacan, Maurras et les Juifs). Éditions Navarin, Paris, 2011
La légende noire de Jacques Lacan : Élisabeth Roudinesco et sa méthode historique. Éditions Navarin, Paris, 2014

See also 
 Javal family
 Henri Ellenberger
 Paul Roazen

References 

20th-century French historians
French women historians
French historiographers
French psychoanalysts
Academic staff of the University of Paris
French people of Jewish descent
French people of Romanian-Jewish descent
Prix Décembre winners
Chevaliers of the Légion d'honneur
Writers from Paris
1944 births
Living people
20th-century French women